Pea Ridge National Military Park is a United States National Military Park located in northwest Arkansas near the Missouri border. The park protects the site of the Battle of Pea Ridge, fought March 7 and 8, 1862. The battle was a victory for the Union, and helped it gain control of the crucial border state of Missouri.

Administrative history

The  Pea Ridge National Military Park was created by an act of Congress in 1956 to preserve the battlefield of the 1862 Battle of Pea Ridge. It was dedicated as a national park during the nation's Civil War Centennial in 1963.

In 1956, the Arkansas congressional delegation proposed legislation to make Pea Ridge a national military park. This was a major breakthrough in American Civil War battlefield preservation. At that time, under the National Park Service classification system, only  should have been preserved, along with a monument. On July 20, 1956, Congress enacted legislation to accept a  donation from the state of Arkansas.

In acquiring the land for the park, the government purchased or used eminent domain on dozens of farms and residences of various sizes, ranging from a few acres to the large Winton Springs estate. Many of the houses and structures were sold and moved off of park property, including some that still stand in nearby Pea Ridge. All other remaining structures, with the exception of the historic Elkhorn Tavern, were demolished by the park, including the elaborate Winton Springs mansion.

Many Union and Confederate veterans attended several reunions at the Pea Ridge battlefield long before it was a park. The first of these reunions was held in 1887, twenty-five years after the battle. The reunions promoted not only remembrance, but healing between the soldiers of each side. The veterans dedicated the first monuments on the battlefield to both the Union and Confederate dead. Historian David W. Blight notes in his book Race and Reunion that in such postwar reconciliation, outstanding issues related to the condition and future of freedmen and racial justice were overlooked. These monuments are still located within the park today.

Visiting the park
The park is acknowledged as one of the best preserved Civil War battlefields.

Gallery

See also
National Register of Historic Places listings in Benton County, Arkansas

References

External links

 Government
 
 General information
 Pea Ridge National Military Park at the American Battlefield Protection Program
 Pea Ridge National Military Park at the Civil War Trust
 Pea Ridge National Military Park at the National Park Foundation

1956 establishments in Arkansas
American Civil War museums in Arkansas
American Civil War on the National Register of Historic Places
Arkansas Heritage Trails System
Arkansas in the American Civil War
Battlefields of the Trans-Mississippi Theater of the American Civil War
Conflict sites on the National Register of Historic Places in Arkansas
Museums in Benton County, Arkansas
National Battlefields and Military Parks of the United States
National Park Service areas in Arkansas
National Register of Historic Places in Benton County, Arkansas
Parks on the National Register of Historic Places in Arkansas
Pea Ridge, Arkansas
Protected areas established in 1956
Protected areas of Benton County, Arkansas
Trail of Tears